Eric Strain (1 December 1915 – 13 February 1975) was a British sailor. He competed in the Dragon event at the 1948 Summer Olympics.

References

External links
 

1915 births
1975 deaths
British male sailors (sport)
Olympic sailors of Great Britain
Sailors at the 1948 Summer Olympics – Dragon
Sportspeople from Belfast